Hawaiian Nights is a 1939 American romantic comedy film directed by Albert S. Rogell. Produced by Universal Pictures, the film was written by Charles Grayson and Lee Loeb. It stars Johnny Downs, Constance Moore, and Mary Carlisle.

A sneak preview of Gone with the Wind was shown during a double-bill with this film and Beau Geste.

Plot
Hotel mogul's son Ted Hartley simply wants to start his own band, but his father sends him to Hawaii to help run one of his properties there. Ted takes his musicians along and is offered free room and board by Lonnie Lane, the daughter of a rival hotel chain's owner, to perform at her family's inn.

Ted's dad flies over, intending to buy out his rival. He finds out what's going on and intends to put a stop to it, but watching Ted's band perform makes him appreciate that his son actually has found his true calling.

Cast
 Constance Moore as Lonnie Lane
 Johnny Downs as Ted Hartley
 Mary Carlisle as Millie
 Eddie Quillan as Ray Peters
 Etienne Girardot as Alonzo Dilman
 Samuel S. Hinds as Lane
 Thurston Hall as T. C. Hartley
 Robert Emmett Keane as Fothering
 Willie Fung as Murphy
 Princess Luana as Luana
 Prince Leilani as Leileni
 Matty Malneck as Orchestra Leader
 Sol Hoopii Jr. as Hawaiian Band Leader
 Matty Malneck's Orchestra
 Sol Hoopii Hawaiian Band

References

External links

1939 films
Films directed by Albert S. Rogell
1939 romantic comedy films
American romantic comedy films
American black-and-white films
1930s American films